Dirk Verdoorn (born 1957 in Dordrecht), is a French peintre de la marine from the Netherlands.
He spent his childhood on a barge at the confluence of the Waal, the Meuse and the Merwede, before settling in France. He worked as an art teacher and stage designer before beginning to sell his paintings in 1997.

In 2001, he received the bronze medal at the Salon de la Marine, then the gold medal two years later. In 2005, he was appointed peintre de la marine agréé.

He currently lives in south Italy, along the Ionian Sea.

Bibliography 

 Dirk Verdoorn, Contemporary Sea Artist, Livre d'art, tome II, éditions Salentina, octobre 2012

 Dirk Verdoorn, Marines as Militant Art,  portrait d'Andrée Maennel dans Dessins et peintures no 19, août-septembre 2009

 Dirk Verdoorn, Contemporary Sea Artist, Livre d'art, Editions Goss, octobre 2008

References

External links 
 Website of the Kona Kai gallery (Florida)

1957 births
Living people
20th-century Dutch painters
20th-century French painters
20th-century French male artists
21st-century French painters
21st-century French male artists
Artists from Dordrecht
Dutch emigrants to France
Dutch male painters
Dutch marine artists
French male painters
French marine artists
20th-century Dutch male artists